René Bjørn Christensen (born 31 October 1970 in Nykøbing Falster) is a Danish politician, who is a member of the Folketing for the Danish People's Party. He entered parliament in 2008 after Mia Falkenberg resigned her seat. Christensen has a background as teacher and mechanic.

Political career
Christensen has been a member of the municipal council of Guldborgsund Municipality since 2006.

Christensen received 1,412 votes in the 2007 Danish general election. While not enough for a seat in parliament, it made him the primary substitute for the Danish People's Party in the Sjælland constituency. He was called upon early in the term to substitute for Mia Falkenberg, from 10 January 2008 to 8 October 2008. Falkenberg resigned her seat on 9 October 2008, and Christensen took over the seat.

At the 2011 election Christensen was elected directly into parliament with 2,580 votes cast for him. He was reelected in 2015 with 8,180 votes and again in 2019 with 5,175 votes.

References

External links 
 Biography on the website of the Danish Parliament (Folketinget)

Living people
1970 births
People from Guldborgsund Municipality
Danish schoolteachers
Danish People's Party politicians
Danish municipal councillors
Members of the Folketing 2007–2011
Members of the Folketing 2011–2015
Members of the Folketing 2015–2019
Members of the Folketing 2019–2022